The Butana Group was a prehistoric, neolithic culture in the eastern part of modern Sudan, that flourished from the fourth to the early third millennium BC. 

The Butana Group is mainly known from its pottery that is often decorated with incised lines, including fingerprints. The ceramic is comparable to those from other (late) neolithic culture in the Sudanese Nile Valley. They produced stone tools. The main economical base was most likely animal breeding, but there is also evidence for domesticated forms of wheat and barley, attesting agriculture. Several animals were hunted such as antelopes, suidae and elephants. Shell middens indicate the extensive use of land snails for food.

Not much is known about settlement patterns, but some settlement sites are almost 10 ha large indicating longer occupations. The people of the Butana Group lived in small, round huts. Not many cemeteries are known, but people were most often buried in a contracted position. The only grave goods are personal adornments, including many lip plugs.

References 

Neolithic cultures of Africa
Butana Group